WNLK (1350 AM; "Veritas Catholic Radio") is a radio station licensed to serve Norwalk, Connecticut. The station broadcasts brokered Christian radio programming. WNLK is owned by Veritas Catholic Network, Inc., after being sold by Cox Radio, Inc. in 2011 and initially operated by Sacred Heart via a local marketing agreement; prior to 2011, WNLK and WSTC simulcast a commercial news/talk format. On January 25, 2016, WNLK dropped its public radio simulcast with WSHU (1260 AM) and went silent, and then returned to the air on June 1, 2016, with a brokered religious format.

The station has been assigned the WNLK call letters by the Federal Communications Commission since it was first licensed.

References

External links
 

 
 

Mass media in Stamford, Connecticut
Radio stations established in 1948
1948 establishments in Connecticut
NLK